Crisis of Faith is the sixth studio album by Canadian rock band Billy Talent, released on January 21, 2022, through Spinefarm Records. It was preceded by four singles; "Forgiveness I + II" "Reckless Paradise", "I Beg to Differ (This Will Get Better)" and "End of Me" featuring Rivers Cuomo. The album had particular success on the charts in German-speaking Europe, debuting at number one in Germany and Switzerland, and number two in Austria.

Critical reception
Crisis of Faith received a score of 76 out of 100 based on five critics' reviews on review aggregator Metacritic, indicating "generally favorable" reception. Neil Z. Yeung of AllMusic described the album as "ten tracks of cathartic release and hardened hope from a band still digesting the chaotic years between releases". Highlighting "Forgiveness I + II" for being a "two-part prog exercise" and "one of the most daring and satisfying creative moves in their decades-long career", Yeung characterised "the rest of the set" as "fairly standard Billy Talent fare, with snaking riffs and pounding drums".

Amgad Abdelgadir of Classic Rock gave the album three-and-a-half stars out of five and also reserved praise for "Forgiveness I + II" for Ian D'Sa's "nimble guitar licks weaving masterfully through Ben Kowalewicz's soaring vibrato".

Reviewing the album for Kerrang!, Mark Sutherland wrote that it is "no surprise" that on first line it "seems to be all over the place", "but dig deeper and you'll find that [... the album] manages to subtly shift its protagonists into the modern age, while retaining just the right amount of callbacks to former glories".

Sputnikmusic staff writer Asleep reserved particular criticism for "End of Me" for containing a "Weezer cameo" and "sound[ing] like [a] Bowling For Soup knockoff", ultimately summarising the album as not living up to the high bar set by their previous material, dismissing it as "a trite, inconsistent, waste of a record that isn't worth your time, your patience or your money".

Track listing

Personnel
Credits adapted from the album's liner notes.

Billy Talent
 Ben Kowalewicz – lead vocals
 Ian D'Sa – guitar, backing vocals
 Jon Gallant – bass, backing vocals
 Jordan Hastings – drums, percussion

Additional personnel
 Rivers Cuomo – additional vocals on "End of Me"
 Dennis Passley – tenor saxophone on "Forgiveness I + II"
 Ernesto Barahona – trombone on "Forgiveness I + II"
 Bruce Mackinnon – alto saxophone on "Forgiveness I + II"
 Tom Moffet – trumpet on "Forgiveness I + II"
 David Campbell – orchestra arrangement and conductor on "The Wolf"
 Alan Umstead, Catherine Umstead, Mary Kathryn VanOsdale, Janet Darnall, Karen Winkelmann, Bruce Wethey, Kimberly Yokoyama, Carrie Bailey – violin on "The Wolf"
 Elizabeth Lamb, Bruce Christensen, Clare Yang – viola on "The Wolf"
 Anthony LaMarchina, Andrew Dunn, Elizabeth Browne, Alex Krew – cello on "The Wolf"
 Craig Nelson, Quentin Flowers – double bass on "The Wolf"

Production
 Ian D'Sa – producer
 Chris Lord-Alge – mixing
 Rich Costey – mixing on "Forgiveness I + II"
 Eric Ratz – engineering
 Kenny Luong – engineering
 Ted Jensen – mastering

Design
 Ryan Quickfall – album artwork
 Antje Schroeder – art layout, package design

Charts

References

2022 albums
Billy Talent albums
Spinefarm Records albums